This is a list of episodes of the British sitcom One Foot in the Grave, written by David Renwick. The show ran for six series of six episodes each. There were also nine specials including two shorts for Comic Relief, first screened from 4 January 1990 to 20 November 2000 on BBC One and subsequently repeated both on the BBC and thereafter on satellite channels such as Gold. While the programme has always been shown after the 9pm watershed on the BBC, other channels have sometimes broadcast it in earlier slots, with minor edits.

The series features the exploits of Victor Meldrew, played by Richard Wilson and his wife, Margaret Meldrew, played by Annette Crosbie, in their battle against the trials of modern life. Most episodes were 30 minutes long, though some were several minutes longer. Christmas editions and other specials were generally longer. Richard Wilson appears in all 42 episodes whilst Annette Crosbie appears in all except for the 1993 episode "The Trial". The character Jean Warboys, played by Doreen Mantle, appeared in 18 episodes, with Nick Swainey, played by Owen Brenman appearing in 15 episodes and Patrick and Pippa Trench played by Angus Deayton and Janine Duvitski in 14. Ronnie (Gordon Peters) appears in three episodes.

There were also two short specials (under ten minutes in length) for Comic Relief, one of which featured Richard Wilson (Victor Meldrew) alone, though it included at one point the voice of Paul Merton. The Comic Relief special in 2001 was set after Victor's death. Though Richard Wilson appeared, Margaret did not interact with Victor's ghost, being unaware of his presence, although she briefly complains about "cold air" beside her.

Series overview

Episodes

Series 1 (1990)

Series 2 (1990)

Series 3 (1991–92)

Series 4 (1993)

Series 5 (1994–97)

Series 6 (2000)

Other media

Comic Relief special (1993–2001)

Clip shows

Radio series (1995)
A series of remakes originally broadcast on BBC Radio 2, with Richard Wilson, Annette Crosbie, Owen Brenman and Doreen Mantle reprising their TV roles. Its original run coincided with the broadcast of TV series 5. All episodes are 30 minutes long and produced by Diane Messias. They were subsequently issued on audio cassette, CD and audio download.

References
General

Richard Webber, "The Complete One Foot in the Grave", Orion Books, 2006

Specific

External links
List of One Foot in the Grave episodes at the British Comedy Guide

BBC-related lists
Lists of British sitcom episodes